Puppet man may refer to:

 "Puppet Man", a song by The 5th Dimension from Portrait, also covered by Tom Jones
 Puppetman alias Senator Gregg Hartmann, a fictional character from the Wild Cards series of books
 Norwich Puppet Man, nickname used for the street entertainer David John Perry